Glass delusion is an external manifestation of a psychiatric disorder recorded in Europe mainly in the late Middle Ages and early modern period (15th to 17th centuries). People feared that they were made of glass "and therefore likely to shatter into pieces".

Delusion

In the 16th and 17th centuries of Europe, glass became a valuable commodity. It was regarded as a magical, alchemical object. Associated with fragility and luxury, glass influenced the way noblemen of early Europe perceived their esteemed positions in society. This fixation on a novel material contributed to the manifestation of the delusion. Edward Shorter, a historian of psychiatry from the University of Toronto, attributes the novelty of glass material in 17th century Europe to the rise of the delusion, stating that "throughout history, the inventive unconscious mind has pegged its delusions on to new materials and the technological advances of the age."

Concentration of the glass delusion among the wealthy and educated classes allowed modern scholars to associate it with a wider and better described disorder of melancholy.

Contemporary accounts
Robert Burton's The Anatomy of Melancholy (1621) touches on the subject in the commentary as one of many related manifestations of the same anxiety: Fear of devils, death, that they shall be so sick, of some such or such disease, ready to tremble at every object, they shall die themselves forthwith, or that some of their dear friends or near allies are certainly dead; imminent danger, loss, disgrace still torment others; that they are all glass, and therefore will suffer no man to come near them; that they are all cork, as light as feathers; others as heavy as lead; some are afraid their heads will fall off their shoulders, that they have frogs in their bellies, Etc.

Miguel de Cervantes based one of his short Exemplary Novels, The Glass Graduate (1613), on the delusion of the title subject, an aspiring young lawyer. The protagonist of the story falls into a grave depression after being bedridden for six months subsequent to being poisoned with a purportedly aphrodisiac potion. He claims that, being of glass, his perceptions are clearer than those of men of flesh and demonstrates by offering witty comments. After two years of illness, Rodaja is cured by a monk; no details of the cure are provided except that the monk is allegedly a miracle-maker.

The Dutch poet Constantijn Huygens wrote a Costly Folly (1622) centered on a subject who "fears everything that moves in his vicinity... the chair will be the death for him; he trembles at the bed, fearful that one will break his bum, the other smash his head". His Dutch contemporary Caspar Barlaeus experienced the glass delusion.

French philosopher René Descartes wrote Meditations on First Philosophy (1641), using the glass delusion as an example of an insane person whose perceived knowledge of the world differs from the majority. In the Essay (Book II, Chapter XI, 13) when proposing his celebrated model of madness, John Locke also refers to the glass delusion. 

In modern times, the glass delusion has not completely disappeared. There are still isolated cases today. "Surveys of modern psychiatric institutions have only revealed two specific (uncorroborated) cases of the glass delusion. Foulché-Delbosc reports finding one Glass Man in a Paris asylum, and a woman who thought she was a potsherd was recorded at an asylum in Merenberg." Andy Lameijn, a psychiatrist from the Netherlands, reports that he has a male patient suffering from the delusion in Leiden.

German alchemist Johann Joachim Becher had a fascination with glass delusion. In Physica Subterranea (1669), he wrote that he discovered a way of turning dead human bodies into glass. However, Becher's claim was not true.

Historical cases

King Charles VI 
King Charles VI of France was famously afflicted by the glass delusion. He wore clothing that was reinforced with iron rods and did not allow his advisors to come near him due to his fear that his body would accidentally "shatter." He may have been the first known case of glass delusion.

Tchaikovsky 
The neurotic behavior of the 19th-century Russian composer Peter Ilyich Tchaikovsky seems reminiscent of the glass delusion, centering as it did on his difficulties caused by his belief that his head would fall off while conducting if he did not hold his chin. While the legend may be exaggerated, it seems to have some basis in fact.

During Tchaikovsky's first attempt at conducting The Voyevoda in 1868, the composer "had felt that his head would fall sideways unless he fought to keep it upright." He mostly avoided conducting due to this affliction, expressing to his patroness "all my life I have been tormented by awareness of my inability to conduct. It has seemed to me there is something shameful and disreputable in not being able to stop myself trembling with fear and horror at the very thought of going out in front of the public with a baton." However, he later overcame his fear and successfully conducted The Enchantress in 1887.

Princess of Bavaria 
Princess Alexandra of Bavaria believed that she had swallowed a glass piano as a child. She was convinced that the object remained inside her body from that point on, fearful that it may shatter and puncture her organs.

See also
 Charles VI of France
 El licenciado Vidriera
 Princess Alexandra of Bavaria

Notes

References 
 
 
 Brown, David (April 1992). Tchaikovsky: The Final Years 1885-1893. W. W. Norton & Company. pp. 97–98. .

Culture-bound syndromes
Obsolete terms for mental disorders
History of glass
Mood disorders